is a female Japanese J-pop singer from Saitama, Japan. Most of her songs are theme songs for anime and video games. She made her debut in 2004 with her first single Kimi ga Sora Datta (君が空だった), which was featured as the ending theme of the anime Mai-HiME. To date she has released sixteen singles, and in addition has been featured in several compilation albums.

She's currently under both SOLID VOX and Lantis recording labels.

Discography

Singles
, released November 26, 2004
Silent wing, released July 6, 2005
UNLIMITED FIRE, released August 24, 2005
, released November 23, 2005
, released February 6, 2006
, released April 26, 2006
, released August 9, 2006
, released January 24, 2007
BLOOD QUEEN, released May 9, 2007
disarm dreamer, released October 24, 2007
sad rain, released May 14, 2008
Life and Proud, released February 4, 2009
Made in WONDER, released August 5, 2009
Scarlet Bomb!, released October 21, 2009
Wild Succession, released November 25, 2009
What a beautiful world, released April 21, 2010
, released July 21, 2010

Albums
Sincerely, released November 22, 2006.
Ashita wo Tomenaide (明日をとめないで)
Yume ni Mita Rakuen (夢にみた楽園)
Silent wing
Shōjo Meiro de Tsukamete (berry's maturing version) (少女迷路でつかまえて [berry's maturing version])
Montage (モンタージュ)
Kimi ga Sora Datta (君が空だった)
UNLIMITED FIRE
Goal to NEW WORLD
before
true love?
Futari ga Wasurenai (ふたりが忘れない)
Kimi ga Sora Datta (acoustic version) (君が空だった [acoustic version])

feel it, released August 8, 2007.
Mou Ai Shika Iranai (もう愛しかいらない)
Kuchibiru Daydream (くちびる白昼夢)
HAPPY CHERRY FESTA!
TOMORROW'S TRUE
If...~I wish~ (feel it mix)
calling
Kizu wa Kaseki ni Narenai Keredo (傷は化石にならないけれど)
Confusion Lovers
Happiness (ハピネス)
Fujiyuu na Emotion (不自由なEmotion)
beautiful flower (feel this ver.)
feel it

here I am, released September 10, 2008.
Shōjo Meiro de Tsukamete (少女迷路でつかまえて)
disarm dreamer
Boukyaku Butterfly (忘却バタフライ)
sad rain (album ver.)
Ima no Kimi ga Tookute mo (いまの君が遠くても)
Ano Hana no Saku Koro ni (あの花の咲く頃に)
BLOOD QUEEN
Kokoro ni Saku Hana (心に咲く花)
I lost the place
Sayonara no Mukou Gawa de (さよならの向こう側で)
another life
here I am

from now on, released January 27, 2010.
Life and proud
Jewelry tears
Little wing
Nami no Kaidan (波の階段)
Scarlet Bomb!
Hide and seek
Unusual Days
all allow
Taiyou no Kizashi (兆しの太陽)
Made in WONDER
Love Wind
from now on

My Honesty, released April 20, 2011.
 honest word, honest world
 Cross Illusion
 最後のエデン
 Separating moment
 さよなら君の声
 奇跡
 once more again
 陽だまりの中へ
 シアワセは月より高く
 あかるい恋のうた
 Wild succession
 僕らの自由
 What a beautiful world

Good Lovin’ , released July 10, 2013.
 Overture
 brilliant voice
 愛のせいで眠れない
 君を感じる世界
 Innocent heart ?しあわせのすぐそばに?
 DESIRE
 unreal love!
 週末COUNT DOWN
 Spread Wings.
 守護心PARADOX
 美しい地球を知る者よ
 Dear my tears

Miscellaneous 

 Anime version of the Visual Novel: Maji De Watashi Ni Koi Shinasai!
 Opening: "U-n-d-e-r—standing!" together with Masaaki Endoh and Hiroshi Kitadani

External links
Aki Misato's personal website 

Aki Misato's CDs (CDJapan.CO)

Anime musicians
Living people
Musicians from Saitama Prefecture
1981 births
21st-century Japanese singers
21st-century Japanese women singers